Stela Eneva (born 18 July 1975) is a Paralympian athlete from Bulgaria competing mainly in throwing events.

She competed at the 2004 Summer Paralympics in Athens, Greece. There she competed in the F42-46 discus throw, shot put and javelin throw events but failed to win any medals.

She had more luck when she competed in the 2008 Summer Paralympics in Beijing, China. There she won a silver medal in the women's F57-58 discus throw event but could not medal in the shot put. She also won silver at the 2012 Paralympics in London.

References

External links
 

1975 births
Living people
Bulgarian female discus throwers
Bulgarian female shot putters
Paralympic medalists in athletics (track and field)
Paralympic athletes of Bulgaria
Paralympic silver medalists for Bulgaria
World record holders in Paralympic athletics
Athletes (track and field) at the 2004 Summer Paralympics
Athletes (track and field) at the 2008 Summer Paralympics
Athletes (track and field) at the 2012 Summer Paralympics
Medalists at the 2008 Summer Paralympics
Medalists at the 2012 Summer Paralympics
20th-century Bulgarian women
21st-century Bulgarian women